Illois is a commune in the Seine-Maritime department in the Normandy region in northern France.

Geography
The A29 autoroute also passes through the commune.

Population

Places of interest
 The church of St. Aubin, dating from the nineteenth century.
 The church of St. Denis at Coupigny, dating from the sixteenth century.
 The church of St. Germain at the hamlet of Mesnil-David, dating from the seventeenth century.
 Two seventeenth century chateaux, at Blois and at Coupigny.

See also
Communes of the Seine-Maritime department

References

Communes of Seine-Maritime